The 2014 Friends Life Women's Tour was the inaugural edition of The Women's Tour, a stage race held in Great Britain, with a UCI rating of 2.1. It was the ninth stage race of the 2014 Women's Elite cycling calendar. It is the only race in Great Britain, apart from the National Championships, on this calendar.

Marianne Vos won the last three of the five stages and the race overall.

Teams
UCI Women's teams

Astana BePink

Estado de México–Faren Kuota
Hitec Products

Orica–AIS

UnitedHealthcare

Lointek

Non-UCI women's teams
Matrix Fitness-Vulpine

National teams

Stages

Stage 1
7 May 2014 — Oundle to Northampton,

Stage 2

8 May 2014 — Hinckley to Bedford,

Stage 3
9 May 2014 — Felixstowe to Clacton-on-Sea,

Stage 4
10 May 2014 — Cheshunt to Welwyn Garden City,

Stage 5
11 May 2014 — Harwich to Bury St Edmunds,

Classification leadership table
 The yellow jersey is awarded to the rider with the lowest overall accumulated time.
 The points jersey is awarded to the rider with the most points accrued from stage finishes, and intermediate sprints on each stage.
 The Queen of the Mountains jersey is awarded to the rider with the most points accrued from the summits of designated climbs on each stage.
 The best young rider jersey is awarded to the rider with the lowest accumulated time who is under 23 years of age.
 The best British rider jersey is awarded to the leading British rider on general classification.

References

External links

The Women's Tour
2014 in British women's sport
The Women's Tour